Vanda bensonii is a species of orchid found from Assam to Thailand.

References

External links

bensonii
Orchids of Assam
Orchids of Thailand